Loopealse (Estonian for "Alvar", literally "Above Alvar") is a subdistrict in the district of Lasnamäe, Tallinn, the capital of Estonia. It has a population of 2,388.

Gallery

See also
Church of the Icon of the Mother of God "Quick to Hearken"

References

Subdistricts of Tallinn